Gianfranco Bozzao (August 3, 1936 - May 24, 2019) was an Italian professional football player.

References

1936 births
2019 deaths
Italian footballers
Serie A players
U.S. Salernitana 1919 players
S.S. Arezzo players
S.P.A.L. players
Juventus F.C. players
Piacenza Calcio 1919 players
Association football defenders